Goran Milojević (born 6 December 1964) is a Serbian retired footballer who played as an attacking midfielder.

Club career
Milojević was born in Aranđelovac, SR Serbia, SFR Yugoslavia. In his country he represented both major clubs, Belgrade's Red Star and FK Partizan, winning the 1988–89 Yugoslav Cup with the latter and scoring in the final against FK Velež Mostar, a 6–1 win.

After one season with Stade Brestois 29 where he was relegated from the French Ligue 1, Milojević moved to Spain where he would spend the better part of his remaining career. He started out at CP Mérida, then moved after a couple of months to La Liga team RCD Mallorca, immediately making an impact although his nine goals (a squad-best) in five months were not enough to prevent relegation, as last.

Milojević then registered an impressive average of 19 goals per campaign in the second division, although Mallorca never promoted in those three years. He returned to the top flight in 1995 with Celta de Vigo, then re-joined former side Mérida in the second level, appearing rarely as they promoted to division one for the second time in their history.

After splitting 1997–98 with two teams, one of them Mexico's Club América, Milojević called it quits at nearly 34. In the beginning of the following decade he took up coaching, managing FK Železnik, FK Rudar Pljevlja, FK Radnički Obrenovac also taking charge of Spanish side Mérida UD, who rose from the ashes of his previous club, folded.

In December 2009, Milojević became head coach of MFK Košice of Slovakia.

International career
Whilst at Partizan, Milojević collected two caps for Yugoslavia. He was, however, overlooked for the squad selected for the 1990 FIFA World Cup in Italy. He was now appointed as the head coach for the Philippines national team for the 2022 FIFA World Cup qualifiers.

Personal life
His brother Vladan was also a footballer and so was Goran's son Stefan.

References

External links

Soccer Mallorca profile 
National team data 

Goran Milojevic at Footballdatabase

1964 births
Living people
People from Aranđelovac
Serbian footballers
Yugoslav footballers
Association football midfielders
Yugoslav First League players
Red Star Belgrade footballers
FK Partizan players
Ligue 1 players
Stade Brestois 29 players
La Liga players
Segunda División players
CP Mérida footballers
RCD Mallorca players
RC Celta de Vigo players
Villarreal CF players
Liga MX players
Club América footballers
Yugoslavia international footballers
Serbian expatriate footballers
Expatriate footballers in France
Expatriate footballers in Spain
Expatriate footballers in Mexico
Serbian expatriate sportspeople in Spain
Serbian football managers
FK Rudar Pljevlja managers
FK Smederevo managers
Mérida UD managers
FC VSS Košice managers
CD Atlético Baleares managers
MFK Ružomberok managers
FK BSK Borča managers
OFK Titograd managers
Ermis Aradippou FC managers
FK Mornar managers
Philippines national football team managers
Serbian expatriate football managers
Expatriate football managers in Spain
Expatriate football managers in Slovakia